Itna Karo Na Mujhe Pyaar  is a Hindi-language soap opera on Indian television which premiered on Sony Entertainment Television India. The soap opera will be produced under Balaji Telefilms.

The show deal with the relationship challenges of a divorced couple and how they remain connected because of their children.

Plot

Ragini Patel is a divorcée and lives with her two children Nishi and Aarav and her mother Asha and grandmother Bakula Nani. She is a strong and independent woman who works in a hospital as administrative head under the hospital owner Dr. Aman Malhotra.

Dr. Neil Khanna, who is Ragini's ex-husband, lives in New York City with his three children Ranbir, Agham, Suhani and his sister Pam. Aarav, Nishi and her fiancé Jignesh find out that Neil lives in New York City. Neil and Ragini decide to live together again but due to circumstances they get separated.

Cast

Main
 Ronit Roy as Dr. Nachiket "Neil" Khanna: Ragini's husband. Nishi, Aarav, Agham and Ranbir's father. Suhani's adoptive father. Pam's elder brother and RK's best friend.
 Pallavi Kulkarni as Ragini Khanna (née Patel): Nachiket's wife. Nishi, Aarav, Agham and Ranbir's mother. Suhani's adoptive mother. Dr. Aman's good friend .
 Avinash Mukherjee as Dr. Ranbir Khanna: Neil and Ragini's elder son
 Rhea Sharma/Vinny Arora as Nishi Shah (née Khanna) : Neil and Ragini's elder daughter, Jignesh’s Wife
 Yatin Mehta as Arav Khanna: Neil and Ragini's younger son
 Rohan Shah as Agham Khanna: Neil and Ragini's second younger son
 Palak Jain as Suhani Khanna: Ronnie and Rupali's daughter, Neil and Ragini's adopted daughter
Recurring 
 Ashwini Kalsekar as Poonam "Pam" Khanna: Neil's sister
 Sayantani Ghosh as Nivedita Basu: Rupali's sister, Pam's best friend, Aman's wife
 Darshan Pandya as Dr. Aman Malhotra: Ragini's boss, Nivedita's husband
 Mehul Vyas as Jignesh Shah: Nishi's husband
 Kishwer Merchant as Dimpy Kapoor: Neil's childhood friend
 Ashwin Mushran as Karan Kapoor: Dimpy's husband
 Anurag Sharma as Ram Kapoor (RK): Karan's younger brother
 Kirti Sually as Asha Patel: Ragini's mother
 Induben Mehta as Bakula (Super Naani): Asha's mother, Ragini's grandmother
 Jyothi Joshi as Sunny Tai: the maid of Patel house
 Mihika Verma as Rupali Basu: Nivedita's sister, Ronnie's wife, Suhani's mother
 Rushad Rana as Ronnie: Rupali's husband, Suhani's real father
 Kuki Grewal as Dr. Devika Mehra
 Ashish Juneja as Dr. Karthik Kumar
 Kalyani Thakkar as Sushila Shah, Jignesh's mother
 Rose Sardana as Suman
 Snehal Pandey as Shilpa: Ranbir and Arav's love interest
 Ritu Vijj as Kuki, Shilpa's mother
 Bhavin Bhanushali as Akash, Arav's friend
Ahmad Harhash as Ranbir Malhotra Arav Best friends

Guest stars

 Bhanujeet Sudan as Babu Bhai
 Vidya Balan as herself, to promote Hamari Adhuri Kahani
 Pratyusha Banerjee appears in an item song
 Mona Singh appears in an item song
 Aishwarya Sakhuja appears in an item song

Versions
{| class="wikitable sortable" style="margin-right: 0;"
|- style="color:white"
! style="background:#7b0c0c; "| Language
! style="background:#7b0c0c; "| Title
! style="background:#7b0c0c; "| Original release
! style="background:#7b0c0c; "| Network(s)
! style="background:#7b0c0c; "| Last aired
! style="background:#7b0c0c; "| Notes
|-
| Hindi
| Itna Karo Na Mujhe Pyaar  इतना करो ना मुझे प्यार'
| 18 November 2014
| Sony Entertainment Television
| 17 November 2015
| Original
|-
| Tamil
| Meera மீரா| 28 March 2022
| Colors Tamil 
| 22 July 2022
| Inspired   
|}

Awards
 2015 Star Guild Awards Best Actor in a Drama Series'' Ronit Roy

References

External links
 Official Page on BalajiTelefilms.com

 [https://lyricswithpj.com/pyaar-karona/ on lyricswithpj.com

Balaji Telefilms television series
Sony Entertainment Television original programming
2014 Indian television series debuts
2015 Indian television series endings
Indian drama television series
Films scored by Lalit Sen
Indian television soap operas